Joel Jalil Julio Mejia (born January 18, 1985  in Montería, Colombia) is a professional Colombian boxer rated as a junior middleweight. In 2005, he was named ESPN.com's Boxing Prospect of the Year and he  has appeared on Ring Magazine's New Faces feature, as well as in ShoBox.

Professional career
Julio's first loss was a 12 round unanimous decision to Puerto Rican boxer Carlos Quintana on June 24, 2006. He has since moved up to Junior Middleweight and bounced back with 5 consecutive wins, a disputed split decision over Cosme Rivera and 3 impressive KO wins over Francisco Campos, Thomas Davis and Mauro Lucero.

On July 11, 2007, Julio faced Cornelius Bundrage of Contender fame. Julio's skill and accuracy became evident early in the fight as he outlanded the slower Bundrage. Julio scored knockdowns in the third and eighth rounds, ultimately winning via eighth round TKO.

Julio took on another former "Contender" participant Ishe Smith on April 30, 2008 in Vancouver.  Smith's defensive style nullified Julio's power but it was not enough to get him the win, with Julio taking a close 10 round unanimous decision.

On August 13, 2008, at the Seminole Hard Rock Hotel and Casino in Hollywood, Florida, Julio defeated Jose Varela by sixth round technical knockout. Julio knocked down his opponent five times before Varela's corner stopped the fight after the conclusion of round six.

On November 1, 2008 Julio suffered the second loss of his career to southpaw Sergiy Dzindziruk via 12 round unanimous decision.

He was stopped by fellow power-punching prospect James Kirkland in his next bout, March 7, 2009.

He was knocked out by Alfredo Angulo during their bout on April 24, 2010.

Titles Won
Julio hasn't held a major title, but captured the following regional titles:

WBA FEDEBOL Welterweight Title (2003)
WBC Continental Americas Light Welterweight Title (2003)
WBA Fedecentro Welterweight Title (2006)
WBO Latino Welterweight Title (2006)

Professional boxing record

References

External links
 Interview with Joel Julio
 
 ESPN.com article naming Joel Julio 2005 Prospect of the Year

1985 births
Living people
Colombian male boxers
Light-middleweight boxers
People from Montería
21st-century Colombian people